Montenegro (lit. "Black Mountain") is a small, mountainous state in south-west Balkans. Montenegro borders Croatia, Bosnia and Herzegovina, Serbia, Albania, Kosovo and the Adriatic Sea. While being a small country at 13,812 km2 (5,332 sq mi), it is very diverse regarding the terrain configuration. Montenegro has 50 peaks of over 2,000m in altitude.

Terrain 

Terrain in Montenegro ranges from high mountains in the northern part of the country, through karst segment in central and western part, to almost 300 km of a narrow coastal plain. The coastal plain disappears completely in the north, where Mount Lovćen and other mountain ranges plunge abruptly into the inlet of the Gulf of Kotor. The coastal region is noted for active seismicity.

The river occupies the centre of Nikšić field, a flat-floored, elongated depression typical of karstic regions. The underlying rock is predominantly limestone, which dissolves to form sinkholes and caves. The longest cave in Montenegro is Vražji firovi - 10,5 km long cave north-east from Berane, and the deepest sinkhole is Željezna jama -1027 m on mount Maganik.

The Zeta River Valley, or Bjelopavlići plain, merges in the southeast with the second significant flat lowland in Montenegro, the Zeta plain. The two plains are today the most densely populated areas of Montenegro, housing the two biggest Montenegrin cities, Podgorica and Nikšić.

The high mountains of Montenegro include some of the most rugged terrain in Europe. Among notable peaks is Bobotov Kuk in the Durmitor mountain, which reaches . The Montenegrin mountains were the most ice-eroded section of the Balkan Peninsula during the last glacial period.

The Coast 

Unlike its northern neighbour Croatia, Montenegro has no large inhabited islands along the coast. A notable feature of the Montenegrin coast is Bay of Kotor, a fjord-like gulf, which is in fact a submerged river canyon.

To the south of the Bay of Kotor, there is a narrow coastal plain, no more than 4 km wide, which is guarded from the north by high mountains. The plain provided space for numerous small coastal settlements.

Hydrology 

Montenegro's surface runoff in the north is carried away by the Lim and Tara river systems, which enter the Danube via the Drina River of Bosnia and Herzegovina. In southern Montenegro, streams flow toward the Adriatic Sea. Much of the drainage of the karstic region is not on the surface but travels in underground channels.

The largest lake in Montenegro and the Balkans is Lake Scutari. Known in Montenegro as Skadarsko Jezero, it lies near the coast and extends across the international border into northern Albania. Some 60 percent lies within Montenegrin territory. The water body occupies a karstic polje depression that has a floor lying below sea level.

Montenegro's mountainous regions are noted for their numerous lakes.

Statistics 

Geographic coordinates: 

Area - comparative: similar in size to The Bahamas

Area

Total: 13,812 km2 (5,332 sq mi)

Land: 13,452 km2 (5,193 sq mi)

Water: 360 km2 (138 sq mi)

Population: 620,029 (2011 census); 653,474 (2013 estimate )

Length of the coast (coastline): 293.5 km (182 mi)

Length of the international borders: 625 km (388 mi) (all)

 With Croatia: 14 km (8 mi) or 25 km (15 mi)
 With Bosnia and Herzegovina: 225 km (139 mi)
 With Serbia: 124 km (77 mi)
 and with Albania: 172 km (106 mi)

Land under cultivation: 517,153 ha

Land use:

arable land: 12.45%
permanent crops: 1.16%
other: 86.39%

Irrigated land: 24.12 km2

Maritime claims: 12 nm

Points
 Lowest point
 Adriatic Sea - 0 m
 Highest point
 Bobotov Kuk - 2,522 m
 Northernmost point:
 Moćevići, Pljevlja municipality - 
 Southernmost point:
 Mala Ada, Ulcinj municipality - 
 Easternmost point:
 Jablanica, Rožaje municipality - 
 Westernmost point:
 Prijevor, Herceg Novi municipality -

Extreme temperatures in Montenegro

See also 
 Geology of Montenegro
 Geography of Europe

References

External links